The Belgo Building is a six-storey building in the Quartier des spectacles district of Montreal, Quebec, Canada. It houses 27 art galleries as well as artist workshops and dance studios. It is located at 372 Saint Catherine Street West.

History

The Belgo Building was designed in 1912 by architects Finley & Spence and completed in 1913. The exterior materials are a combination of yellow brick, Indiana limestone and Montreal greystone. The building was altered in 1958 by architect F. David Mathias, who renovated the main entrance in polished green granite.

The building originally housed a luxury department store known as Scroggie's. It was later sold to an American company and renamed Almy's, after which the upper floors were leased to companies in the garment industry. Almy's closed in 1922, after which the entire building was used by the garment industry.

In the 1980s artists began renting out space in the building, while garment business were moving out, as the garment district shifted north to Mile End and later Ahuntsic.

Today, the building is home to the largest concentration of contemporary art galleries in Canada.

References

1913 establishments in Canada
Art museums and galleries in Quebec
Buildings and structures completed in 1913
Buildings and structures in Montreal
Quartier des spectacles